The 2011–12 season are the Sepahan Football Clubs 11th season in the Iran Pro League, and their 19th consecutive season in the top division of Iranian football which they won their 4th title in this season. They also competed in the Hazfi Cup but were eliminated by Foolad in Round of 32 and are also competing in AFC Champions League, and 59th year in existence as a football club.

Player

First-team squad
As of 23 July 2011.

Iran Pro League squad

On loan

For recent transfers, see List of Iranian football transfers winter 2011–12.

Transfers
Confirmed transfers 2011–12
 Updated on 31 August 2012

Summer 2011

In:

Out:

Winter 2011–12

In:

Out:

Competitions

Iran Pro League

 Standings 

 Results summary 

 Results by round 

Matches

AFC Champions League

 AFC Champions League 2011 

 Quarter-finals 

 AFC Champions League 2012 

Group stage

 Knockout stage 

Hazfi Cup

 Matches 

 Round of 32 

Friendly Matches

Statistics

 Appearances 

Apps: x+y, where x means full match (90-minute) appearance and y means appearance as an exchange (In or Out) player.

Goal scorers
Includes all competitive matches. The list is sorted by shirt number when total goals are equal.Last updated on 31 August 2012Friendlies and Pre-season goals are not recognized as competitive match goals.Disciplinary record
Includes all competitive matches. Players with 1 card or more included only.Last updated on 31 August 2012''

Goals conceded 
 Updated on 31 August 2012

Own goals 
 Updated on 31 August 2012

Club

Coaching staff

Other information

See also
2011–12 Persian Gulf Cup
2011–12 Hazfi Cup
2011 AFC Champions League
2012 AFC Champions League

References

External links
Iran Premier League Statistics
Persian League

2011-12
Iranian football clubs 2011–12 season